The 1991 Grand Prix Passing Shot, also known as the Bordeaux Open, was a men's tennis tournament played on outdoor clay courts at Villa Primrose in Bordeaux, France that was part of the World Series of the 1991 ATP Tour. It was the 14th edition of the tournament and was held from 9 September until 15 September 1991. First-seeded Guy Forget, who entered on a wildcard, won his second consecutive singles title at the event.

Finals

Singles
 Guy Forget defeated  Olivier Delaître 6–1, 6–3
 It was Forget's 4th singles title of the year and the 7th of his career.

Doubles
 Arnaud Boetsch /  Guy Forget defeated  Patrik Kühnen /  Alexander Mronz 6–2, 6–2

References

External links
 ITF tournament edition details

Grand Prix Passing Shot
ATP Bordeaux
Grand Prix Passing Shot
Grand Prix Passing Shot